The Stranded on the Earth World Tour is a concert tour by Noel Gallagher's High Flying Birds to support Gallagher's 2017 album Who Built the Moon?.

Background
On 25 September 2017, Noel Gallagher announced Who Built the Moon?, the High Flying Birds third studio album. Concerts were also announced, taking place in Europe. Beginning on 3 April at Paris' L'Olympia Theatre and ending at the 3Arena in Dublin. Later the same day concerts taking place throughout North American were also announced.

Set list
The band's typical set list is:

"Fort Knox"
"Holy Mountain"
"Keep On Reaching"
"It's a Beautiful World"
"In the Heat of the Moment"
"Riverman"
"Ballad of the Mighty I"
"If I Had a Gun..."
"Dream On"
"Little by Little"
"The Importance of Being Idle"
"If Love Is the Law"
"Dead In The Water"
"Be Careful What You Wish For"
"She Taught Me How To Fly"
"Half the World Away"
"Wonderwall"
"AKA... What a Life!"
Encore
"The Right Stuff"
"Go Let It Out"
"Don't Look Back in Anger"
"All You Need Is Love"

Shows

Cancellations and rescheduled shows

Personnel

Noel Gallagher — lead vocals, lead guitar & rhythm guitar
Gem Archer — lead guitar & rhythm guitar
Russell Pritchard – bass, backing vocals
Mike Rowe – piano, keyboards
Chris Sharrock — drums
YSEE – Vocals

Ben Edwards – trumpet
Jessica Greenfield – keyboards, percussion, backing vocals
Steve Hamilton – saxophone
Alistair White – trombone
Charlotte Marionneau — additional vocals, scissors, percussion, tin whistle

Notes

References

External links
 noelgallagher.com

2018 concert tours
2019 concert tours
Noel Gallagher's High Flying Birds